Anbaran-e Olya (also Romanized as ‘Anbarān-e ‘Olyā; also known as ‘Anbarān-e Bālā) is a village in Anbaran Rural District of Anbaran District, Namin County, Ardabil province, Iran. At the 2006 census, its population was 706 in 183 households. The following census in 2011 counted 549 people in 177 households. The latest census in 2016 showed a population of 933 people in 312 households; it was the largest village in its rural district.

References 

Namin County

Towns and villages in Namin County

Populated places in Ardabil Province

Populated places in Namin County